Victor Joseph Mete (born June 7, 1998) is a Canadian professional ice hockey defenceman for the  Toronto Maple Leafs of the National Hockey League (NHL). Mete was selected 100th overall by the Montreal Canadiens in the 2016 NHL Entry Draft.

Playing career
Mete was drafted in the first round, eighth overall by the Owen Sound Attack in the 2014 OHL draft, but was traded before making an appearance with the club to the London Knights in exchange for six draft picks (three seconds, two thirds and a conditional sixth). He would go on to play three seasons with the London Knights, helping the team win the Memorial Cup in 2016. Shortly after the Memorial Cup win, Mete was drafted by the Montreal Canadiens in the fourth round, 100th overall during the 2016 NHL Entry Draft.

On March 27, 2017, Mete was signed to a three-year, entry-level contract with the Canadiens. Shortly after, leading up to the 2017–18 season, Mete impressed at Montreal training camp and made the opening night roster. He picked up his first point on October 17, registering an assist in a 5–2 defeat to the San Jose Sharks. On March 2, 2018, Mete left a game against the New York Islanders due to an injury, and a few days later it was announced that Mete suffered a finger fracture and was set to be out for six weeks.

Mete began the 2018–19 season with the Canadiens in the NHL. After struggling in his first 23 games of the season, Mete was sent to the Canadiens American Hockey League affiliate, the Laval Rocket, to help his development. Mete was recalled to the NHL on December 17 after recording one goal and three assists in seven AHL games.

Mete made the Canadiens lineup out of training camp for the 2019–20 season. After going goalless to start the season, Mete broke his 127-game, franchise-record goalless streak in a 4–0 win over the Minnesota Wild. In the same game, rookie Nick Suzuki also scored his first career NHL goal, making the pair the first Canadiens players to score their first NHL goal in the same game since 2005. In 51 games with the Canadiens, Mete tallied 4 goals and 11 points from the blueline before suffering a season-ending broken foot against the Detroit Red Wings on February 18, 2020.

On October 9, 2020, Mete signed a one-year contract extension with the Canadiens. In the following pandemic delayed 2020–21 season, Mete was dressed in just 14 games, collecting 3 assists, before he was placed on waivers approaching the NHL trade deadline.

On April 12, 2021, Mete was claimed off waivers by the Ottawa Senators, and on August 4, 2021, the Senators re-signed him to a one-year, $1.2 million contract.

At the conclusion of the following season, Mete was not tendered a qualifying offer by the Senators to retain his exclusive negotioating rights, thereby releasing him to unrestricted free agency. On July 14, the day after free agency, Mete signed a one-year, $750,000 contract with his hometown Toronto Maple Leafs.

International play

On December 16, 2017, Mete was named to the 22 man roster representing Canada at the IIHF World U20 Championship. On December 23, 2017, he was named alternate captain. Team Canada ended up winning the gold medal at that tournament.

Personal life
Mete is of Italian descent. In 2022, Mete's grandfather, Vittorio Panza, was killed during the 2022 Vaughan shooting.

Career statistics

Regular season and playoffs

International

Awards and honours

References

External links
 

1998 births
Living people
Canadian ice hockey defencemen
Canadian sportspeople of Italian descent
London Knights players
Montreal Canadiens draft picks
Montreal Canadiens players
Ottawa Senators players
Ice hockey people from Toronto
Toronto Maple Leafs players
Toronto Marlies players